C. P. John (born 22 April 1957) is an Indian politician and the General Secretary of the Communist Marxist Party. He is the National executive member of Hind Mazdoor Sabha. He was the Vice President of Students' Federation of India (SFI) Central committee during 1978 and the youngest President of Kerala State committee of SFI. He served two terms as a member of Kerala State Planning Board.

John is a prominent leader of the United Democratic Front, and acts as spokesperson on behalf of the UDF. He was one of the Communist Party of India (Marxist) leadership that sided with M.V. Raghavan when the latter broke with CPI(M) in 1986 and founded the Communist Marxist Party. When M.V. Raghavan died in 2014, the party had split and with the C.P. John-led faction staying with UDF. In 2016 C.P. John was elected general secretary of the Confederation of Indian Communists and Democratic Socialists.

References

1957 births
Living people
Communist Marxist Party politicians
Communist Party of India (Marxist) politicians from Kerala